Chuck Boyd (1942–1991) was a professional rock and roll photographer based in Los Angeles, California.  Boyd took over 30,000 photographs of rock and roll performers from the 1960s and 1970s.  After he died in 1991, his photographs were lost for nearly twenty years.  Between 1964 and 1979, Boyd photographed artists and musicians including The Beatles, Jimi Hendrix, Led Zeppelin, The Rolling Stones, and The Who. After their discovery, the images were being made available for the public in 2010.

Early life
Chuck Boyd's love affair with photography began when his mother gave him a camera as a gift when he was 13 years old. He quickly found his artistic voice, and at the age of 16, he went to work for Los Angeles radio station KRLA, covering special artist promotional functions.

Career

Beginnings
Shortly after beginning his work at the station, Boyd began working for Tiger Beat, shooting rock-and-roll acts for the influential teen culture and music magazine. In 1967, Buck Munger, an independent record producer and the national promotion director for Sunn Amplifiers, hired Boyd as Sunn's official photographer. While working with Munger, Boyd had the opportunity to photograph Cream, Elton John, Led Zeppelin, KISS, and dozens of other artists throughout the 1960s and '70s. Since he was often shooting photos for Sunn, Boyd always had unlimited stage access. His photographs represent both his talent and his incredible access to rock-and-roll stars both on and off the stage.

References

External links
 chuckboydgalleries.com
 /commons.wikimedia.org/wiki/File:Chuck_Boyd_Photography.jpg
 https://web.archive.org/web/20110224071500/http://www.gibson.com/en-us/Lifestyle/News/lost-rockstar-photos-1220/

20th-century American photographers
1991 deaths
1942 births